Throw Down Your Arms is Sinéad O'Connor's seventh studio album, and her first reggae album. O'Connor sings cover versions of classic roots reggae songs, with production by Sly and Robbie.

The album was recorded in Kingston, Jamaica at Tuff Gong Studios and Anchor Studios in 2004 and released by Chocolate and Vanilla on 4 October 2005. 10 per cent of the profits went to support Rastafari elders in Jamaica.

Track listing

The original songs were recorded by the following Jamaican reggae artists:
"Marcus Say Jah No Dead" (Burning Spear in 1978)
"Marcus Garvey" (Burning Spear in 1975)
"Door Peep" (Burning Spear in 1976)
"He Prayed" (Burning Spear in 1973)
"Y Mas Gan" (The Abyssinians in 1969)
"Curly Locks" (Junior Byles in 1974)
"Vampire" (Devon Irons in 1976)
"Prophet Has Arise" (Israel Vibration in 1978)
"Downpressor Man" (Peter Tosh in 1977*)
"Throw Down Your Arms" (Burning Spear in 1977)
"Untold Stories" (Buju Banton in 1995)
"War" (Bob Marley & The Wailers in 1976)

The Japanese version of the CD also includes:
"Move Out Of Babylon" (Johnny Clarke in 1974)
"Abendigo" (The Abyssinians in 1969)
"Jah Can Count On I" (Little Roy in 1975).

Note: Sinéad O'Connor cover of "Downpressor Man" is closer to Peter Tosh recording made in 1977. But the song was previously recorded three other times by Peter Tosh with The Wailers: "Sinner Man" (1966, produced by Coxsone Dodd), "Downpresser" (1971, produced by Lee Perry) and "Oppressor Man" (1972, produced by Peter Tosh).The cover of "Marcus Say Jah No Dead" is closer to Burning Spear's a cappella version featured on the Rockers soundtrack.A few other reggae covers were done by Sinéad O'Connor when she was touring to promote the album, such as "Rivers Of Babylon" (by The Melodians), "None A Jah Jah Children No Cry" (by Ras Michael & The Sons Of Negus), "Keep Cool Babylon" (by Ras Michael & The Sons Of Negus), "Stepping Razor" and "Creation" (by Peter Tosh).

Personnel
Sinéad O'Connor - vocals, low whistle
Sly Dunbar - drums
Robbie Shakespeare - bass
Mikey Chung - lead guitar
Dalton Brownie - rhythm guitar
Glen Brownie - acoustic guitar on "Untold Stories"
Robbie Lyn - keyboards, Hammond organ
Carol "Bowie" McLaughlin - piano
Steven "Lenkky" Marsden - piano on "Curly Locks"
Uziah Thompson - percussion
Dean Fraser - saxophone
David Madden - trumpet
Pam Hall, Keisha Patterson, Katrina Harley - backing vocals

Charts

Certifications

References

External links
 

2005 albums
Reggae albums by Irish artists
Albums produced by Sly and Robbie
Sinéad O'Connor albums